Legendary Weapons is a compilation album by American hip hop group Wu-Tang Clan, which was released July 26, 2011 on E1 Music. It follows 2009's Wu-Tang Chamber Music. Legendary Weapons features performances by several Wu-Tang members (GZA and Masta Killa are absent), and affiliates Trife Diesel, Killa Sin and Bronze Nazareth. Other guests include Sean Price, M.O.P., AZ, Action Bronson & Roc Marciano among others.

The album debuted at number 41 on the US Billboard 200 chart, with first-week sales of 10,000 copies in the United States. As of November 27, 2011, the album has sold a total of 25,000 copies in the United States. In Canada, the album debuted at #98 on the Canadian Albums Chart.

Track listing

Charts

Weekly charts

References

External links

Wu-Tang Clan albums
2011 compilation albums